St Mary Magdalene Church is a church in Sandringham, Norfolk, England, located just to the southwest of Sandringham House. Members of  the British Royal Family attend services when in residence at Sandringham, which normally includes Christmas. The church is dedicated to Mary Magdalene, a disciple of Jesus and the current rector is the Reverend Canon Paul Williams.

History

The Grade II* listed church is dedicated to Mary Magdalene and is described as a small building in the Perpendicular style, "nobly lying on raised ground". The current building dates to the 16th century and was restored by S. S. Teulon in 1855 and Arthur Blomfield in 1890. It is considered to be a noteworthy example of a carrstone building. It is located in the park and is approached from Sandringham House through the garden by "an avenue of fine old Scotch firs". 

The church's silver altar and reredos, created by the silversmiths Barkentin & Krall, were presented to Queen Alexandra by the American department store owner Rodman Wanamaker as a tribute to Edward VII. He also presented her with the silver pulpit and a silver 17th-century Spanish processional cross. Of note also is a Florentine marble font and a Greek font dating to the 9th-century.

Burials
There are memorials to many members and relations of the Royal Family in the church and churchyard. Prince John (12 July 1905 – 18 January 1919) is buried here. After his death in February 1952, the body of King George VI was placed in the church for two days prior to its lying in state in Westminster Hall.

Baptisms
The church has been the site of many royal baptisms. These baptisms include:

 King George VI was baptised on 10 February 1896
 Mary, Princess Royal and Countess of Harewood, was baptised on 7 June 1897
 King Olav V of Norway was baptised on 11 August 1903
 Prince John was baptised on 3 August 1905
 Diana, Princess of Wales, was baptised on 30 August 1961
 Princess Eugenie of York was baptised 23 December 1990 
 Princess Charlotte of Wales was baptised 5 July 2015

References

16th-century Church of England church buildings
Church of England church buildings in Norfolk
Grade II* listed churches in Norfolk
Sandringham, Norfolk
Arthur Blomfield church buildings
Samuel Sanders Teulon buildings